Harold George Howe (6 October 1906 – 27 April 1976) was a professional footballer from Hertfordshire, England.

Howe was one of Hemel Hempstead's first professional footballers. He started his playing career with Apsley and signed professional forms for Watford at the age of 20. At the height of his career, he played for Queens Park Rangers and later Crystal Palace. After a spell with Rochdale, he finished his playing career with Tunbridge Wells Rangers in the Southern League.

After retiring from football, Howe remained a keen sportsman taking up golf and darts. He became a prominent darts player winning the News of the World individual area championship.

References

1906 births
English footballers
Tunbridge Wells F.C. players
Watford F.C. players
Crystal Palace F.C. players
Queens Park Rangers F.C. players
Rochdale A.F.C. players
1976 deaths
Association footballers not categorized by position